The DSLink is a 1st generation storage device used to run Nintendo DS homebrew.  It allows the running Nintendo DS games and programs created by unofficial developers.  It also allows the running of Nintendo DS game ROMs.

Unlike most similar devices at the time, it uses Slot 1 (the DS card slot) instead of Slot 2 (as most Game Boy Advance flash cartridges do) marking it as one of the first entries in the market to do this, allowing for the use of other GBA slot devices such as the Rumble Pak, Nintendo DS Browser RAM expansion cart, etc.

Considerations 
As with all flash carts, there are many considerations that a user will need to be aware of before purchasing.

'Time to play' speed concerns 
This device has a fairly long "time to play" time, meaning the time from "power on" until you're engaged in a selected program running on it is considerably longer than similar devices.

Customizable interface 
The product can be "skinned" with user-created artwork and sound effects;  no editor of any kind is provided for this task.

Flash media pricing and availability 
TransFlash memory is a fairly recent technology and hence will cost more than comparable sized SD memory such as the MicroSD or MiniSD.

FATLib support 
Many homebrew developers use a library called FatLib to create Nintendo DS programs that read/write to the FAT file system used for the SD flash memory.  Currently, this library is not supported on the DSLink and will cause many programs that use it not to function properly.

Known issues 
There are several known issues with this product, all of which can presumably be solved with firmware/software upgrades.

Non-working images 
There are many titles that function incorrectly or not at all with the DSLink.

 New Super Mario Bros. (Mini-Games do not run)
 The Chronicles of Narnia: The Lion, the Witch and the Wardrobe save files from other products do not appear to convert to DSLink format
 Animal Crossing: Wild World (slowdown during game)
 Ultimate Spider-Man (cannot get past intro scene - product website has a saver file fix)

Working homebrew software 
 Requires further investigation.

Software used with the hardware 
The product comes with a Windows-based program, known as a 'patcher', that will patch game images and other software to make it compatible with the DSLink.  The software also generates and copies over support files the DSLink needs to generate the menus, saver files, etc.  It will also convert saver files from other similar devices and makes them compatible with the DSLink.

Legality of backup devices

Overview 
The legality of such products has been challenged and laws vary from country to country on their ownership and usage.  In the United States, the Digital Millennium Copyright Act would arguably prevent the legal use of this device.

Philosophy of legitimate uses 
While legal or not, the moral uses of these devices could be easily argued.  In addition to allowing the freedom to run 'unsigned' third party code (such as media players, PDA software, etc).

The most prolific use of these devices is the ability for legitimate owners of software to "multi-boot" to several programs stored on the card at any given time without the need to carry easily-lost SD card sized Nintendo DS programs.  With substantial investments in software, users should have the convenience of such products; taking copies on the go while leaving the original product in a safe location.

Specifications 
 1st generation Slot 1 storage device
 Uses TransFlash (aka MicroSD) - No capacity limit mentioned
 4M built in saver memory (no battery is used)
 Supports GBA game linking
 NoPassMe function, FlashMe V7x required!
 Requires a "FlashMe'd" Nintendo DS (classic or Lite model)
 Supports Moonshell (media player)

External links 
 PHWiki:GBA Flash Cards
 DSLink Website - The official product website

Nintendo DS accessories
Unlicensed Nintendo hardware